Frank and Anna Hunter House, also known as Pocohontas County Museum, is a historic home located at Marlinton, Pocahontas County, West Virginia. It was built in 1903, and is a two-story, square frame dwelling. The house has a hipped roof with dormers and crowned with a captain's walk.  The front elevation features Victorian-Gothic "icing" ornamentation.  Also on the property is a log cabin built about 1850 and moved to the property from nearby Beards Mountain.  The Pocohontas County Historical Society purchased the property for use as a museum in 1963.

It was listed on the National Register of Historic Places in 1976.

References

External links
 Pocohontas County Historical Society

History museums in West Virginia
Houses on the National Register of Historic Places in West Virginia
Houses completed in 1903
Houses in Pocahontas County, West Virginia
Museums in Pocahontas County, West Virginia
National Register of Historic Places in Pocahontas County, West Virginia